The International Teledemocracy Centre (ITC) was established at Edinburgh Napier University in 1999. The centre is dedicated to researching innovative E-democracy systems that will strengthen public understanding and participation in democratic decision making. 

ITC have worked in a number of roles on E-participation and E-democracy initiatives and research projects with a wide range of partners including parliaments, government departments and local authorities, NGOs, charities, youth groups, media and technical and research organisations. 

One of its first projects, undertaken in partnership with BT Scotland, was the design of the E-Petitioner internet petitioning system.

External links
 ITC Home Page

Edinburgh Napier University
1999 establishments in Scotland
Educational institutions established in 1999
E-democracy